Lorri Houston (aka Lorri Bauston) is a pioneer for the farm animal sanctuary movement.  Houston has been an animal rights researcher, activist, and a vegan for most of her life. She co-founded the Farm Sanctuary in 1986 and founded Animal Acres in 2005. Houston has played a crucial role in the animal rights and activism movement over the past 20 years, and has made significant contributions to legislation and legal terminology regarding animal cruelty against farm animals subject to factory faming. Houston's work with animal rights is strongly tied to feminist theory because of its deep-rooted connections between the oppression of women and the oppression of animals in society.

Personal life 
Houston was born May 11 in Madison, Wisconsin and still resides there today. She attended the University of Wisconsin-Madison where she obtained a Master of Public Policy & Administration (MPA) and a Master of Social Work, Public Administration and Social Service Professions. Houston graduated 1983, and quickly became involved in animal rights research and activism. While working at Greenpeace in Chicago, Houston met her now ex-husband, Gene Baur. When they married, Lorri and Gene merged their last names to become Lorri and Gene Bauston (after their divorce, they went back to their original names). Soon later, they rescued a sheep named Hilda and co-founded Farm Sanctuary in 1986.

Houston is a practicing vegan and a practicing Buddhist in the tradition of Thich Nhat Hanh. She is currently the Senior Marketing Specialist at Center for Healthy Minds and a leader of Dharma Voices for Animals-Madison. She's a board member of Heartland Farm Sanctuary. Her hobbies include yoga, hiking, and listening to Dharma talks.

Farm Sanctuary 
The Farm Sanctuary was the first shelter for farm animals; created to protect and advocate for the rights of farm animals against the horrors of factory farming and mistreatment of animals. While doing research and observation at a stockyard in Lancaster, Pennsylvania, Houston came across a living sheep on a pile of dead carcasses. She is now known as Hilda, and was immediately rescued by Houston and was taken to a veterinarian. It turned out that Hilda was perfectly healthy, but was discarded as a “downer” because she was unable to stand after enduring the brutal conditions of transportation from farm to factory. Unable to keep a sheep in her backyard forever, Houston started Farm Sanctuary with then-husband Gene Baur, and Hilda was their first rescued farm animal. Today, Farm Sanctuary houses over 400 rescued farm animals in three locations in the United States. Houston left Farm Sanctuary in 2004 to begin the establishment of Animal Acres in 2005.

Animal Acres 
Animal Acres was founded in May 2005 as an extension of Houston’s work with the Farm Sanctuary. It provides a home for farm animals that have been abused, neglected, and/or mistreated and gives them the proper care they need. Located in Los Angeles County, California, Animal Acres also provides tours to educate the public about factory farming, vegetarianism/veganism, and animal rights. The shelter currently houses over 150 rescued farm animals. Houston left Animal acres in April 2011.

Veganism 
At fifteen years old, Lorri Houston asked herself, "If I love animals, why am I eating them?" It was in that moment that her vegan lifestyle and pursuits in animal welfare began. She has been heavily involved with vegan promotional organizations such as PETA and The Humane Society of the United States, and with events such as Taking Action For Animals, Mad City Vegan Fest, and Vegan Earth Day.

References 

Living people
Year of birth missing (living people)
American animal rights activists
American veganism activists
Keepers of animal sanctuaries
People from Madison, Wisconsin
Robert M. La Follette School of Public Affairs alumni
University of Wisconsin-Madison School of Social Work alumni